The 1975 Monaco Grand Prix was a Formula One motor race held in Monaco on 11 May 1975. It was race 5 of 14 in both the 1975 World Championship of Drivers and the 1975 International Cup for Formula One Manufacturers. It was the 33rd Monaco Grand Prix since the race was first held in 1929. It was held over 75 of the scheduled 78 laps of the three kilometre street circuit, for a race distance of 245 kilometres.

The race was won by Austrian driver Niki Lauda giving the new Ferrari 312T its first win. The win broke a 20-year drought at Monaco for Ferrari. Lauda dominated the race, only losing the lead during a pitstop. He won by two seconds over the McLaren M23 of Emerson Fittipaldi. Carlos Pace finished third in his Brabham BT44B.

Circuit changes and qualifying summary 
The future of Grand Prix racing was under scrutiny following the disastrous Spanish Grand Prix held two weeks prior. Actions had to be taken quickly: extra guard rails and catch fences were erected, kerbing resited and the chicane was modified. New measures were introduced: the grid was staggered and in addition would be restricted to just 18 cars. This last change affected Graham Hill's chance to qualify: the five-time Monaco winner had all sorts of practice problems and failed to qualify by 0.377 seconds. John Watson and Clay Regazzoni collided in practice, whilst the Surtees team was ordered to remove pro-Europe political stickers from its cars.

Niki Lauda, in a Ferrari, claimed pole position, but sensationally sharing the front row was Tom Pryce, driving a Shadow, who just 12 months earlier had been deemed 'too inexperienced' to compete. Jean-Pierre Jarier and Ronnie Peterson filled the second row.

Race summary 
The race began under rain conditions, so everyone went for wet tyres. Lauda was fastest at the start, while Pryce had a slow start and was passed by Jarier and Peterson; the Frenchman soon attempted to pass Lauda in an ill-advised overtaking manoeuvre, and hit the barriers at the Mirabeau; his car was damaged in the collision and handled badly, which caused him to hit the wall again at the Tabac corner and then retire. Peterson went into the second place with Vittorio Brambilla third, until Pryce hit the Italian's wheel. Regazzoni stopped to change a tyre and the nosecone of his car, and James Hunt stopped to change onto slick tyres, anticipating a drying of the track surface. However, his team's slow pit work cost him a substantial amount of time.

Ronnie Peterson's victory chances were damaged at his pit stop when a wheel nut was lost under the car. Tom Pryce came in to replace a broken nosecone, and by that time Niki Lauda led by 15 seconds from Emerson Fittipaldi and Carlos Pace. Many accidents happened during the race: Jochen Mass and James Hunt tangled at Mirabeau, and Patrick Depailler got embroiled in their accident; Clay Regazzoni hit the chicane and suffered damage; John Watson spun and stalled the engine of his car; Pryce hit the barrier and had to retire; Mario Andretti entered the pits with his car on fire; Mark Donohue hit the barrier, whilst Alan Jones broke a wheel.

In the last laps Lauda's oil pressure was fading and Fittipaldi was closing. With three laps left the gap was 2.75 seconds; however, the two-hour time limit was reached and the race was stopped, with Lauda winning. Ferrari had won their first Monaco Grand Prix in 20 years; the tragedy of the Spanish Grand Prix receded and the championship race was back on. Fittipaldi's second position strengthened his narrow points lead over early season points leader Pace.

Classification

Qualifying classification 

*Positions in red indicate entries that failed to qualify.

Race classification

Championship standings after the race

Drivers' Championship standings

Constructors' Championship standings

Note: Only the top five positions are included for both sets of standings.

References

Further reading

Monaco Grand Prix
Monaco Grand Prix
Grand Prix